Phaeoxantha limata is a species of tiger beetle in the subfamily Cicindelinae that was described by Perty in 1830, and can be found in Argentina, Brazil, Paraguay, and Peru.

References

Beetles described in 1830
Beetles of South America